Cameron Reny (née Jordan) is an American politician from Maine serving in the Maine State Senate. Reny represents Maine Senate District 13, comprising all of Lincoln County except for Dresden, as well as the towns of Washington and Windsor. Reny grew up in Lincoln County where she attended Lincoln Academy and then Guilford College and the University of Southern Maine. She has worked as a school counselor since 2014 and was elected to the Maine Senate in 2022.

Early life & education
Reny is a lifelong resident of Lincoln County. She grew up in Round Pond, Maine in a working-class family; her parents worked various jobs including carpentry, machining, and painting. Reny graduated from Lincoln Academy and attended Guilford College, where she graduated with a degree in community and justice studies. She was the first in her family to finish college. Reny completed her Master of Science in school counseling from the University of Southern Maine.

Career
Reny has worked in school counseling since January of 2014. She is a past president of the Maine School Counselor Association. and an alumni of the Emerge Maine candidate training program.

Maine State Legislature
Reny announced her candidacy for the Maine Senate on January 15, 2022. Senate District 13 was previously represented by Chloe Maxmin who did not seek reelection. Reny defeated primary challenger David Levesque 67%-33% in June 2022, and in the November general election she won against Republican Abden Simmons 55%-45%.

Personal life
Reny lives in Bristol, Maine  with her husband Adam, an owner-operator at Renys. They have been married since 2014. The couple has two sons, born in 2018 and 2021. In her spare time, Reny enjoys cooking, reading and beekeeping.

Electoral history

References

External links
Maine Senate Democrats: Cameron Reny
Emerge Maine

Living people
Lincoln Academy (Maine) alumni
Maine Democrats
Maine state senators
People from Bristol, Maine
Guilford College alumni
University of Southern Maine alumni
School counselors
Year of birth missing (living people)